Pregl is a surname. Notable people with the name include:

 Fritz Pregl (1869–1930), Slovenian and Austrian chemist and physician 
 Marko Pregl, 16th-century politician in Slovenia
 Slavko Pregl (born 1945), Slovenian writer, editor and publisher

See also 
Fritz Pregl Prize, Austrian science and technology awards

Slovene-language surnames